The 2014 Ladies Tour of Qatar was the 6th edition of the Ladies Tour of Qatar. It was organised by the Qatar Cycling Federation with technical and sports-related assistance from Amaury Sport Organisation (A.S.O.) under the regulations of the Union Cycliste Internationale (category 2.1). It took place from Tuesday 4 February until Friday 7 February 2014 and consisted of 4 stages. 15 teams of 6 riders took part.

One of the favourites for the title, Ellen van Dijk, was not able to participate because she had not recovered from an illness.

Teams
Fifteen teams competed in the 2014 Ladies Tour of Qatar. These included twelve UCI Women's Teams and three national teams.

UCI teams
 
 RusVelo
 Alé–Cipollini
 
 Team Giant–Shimano
 China Chongming–Giant Pro Cycling
 Wiggle–Honda
 Astana BePink
 Hitec Products UCK
 Orica–AIS
 
 Lotto–Belisol Ladies

National teams

 Italy
 Australia

Source

Stages

Stage 1
4 February 2014 – Museum of Islamic Art to Mesaieed,

Stage 2
5 February 2014 – Al Zubarah to Shamal City,

Stage 3
6 February 2014 – Katara Cultural Village to Al Khor Corniche,

Stage 4
7 February 2014 – Sealine Beach Resort to Doha Corniche,

Classification leadership table

References

External links

See also
2014 in women's road cycling

Tour of Qatar
Ladies tour of Qatar
Ladies tour of Qatar
Ladies Tour of Qatar